The Yōwa famine (養和の飢饉, Yōwa no kikin),  was a famine which affected Japan at the end of Heian period. Famine is considered to have begun in 1181, and lasted until 1182.  It was named after the Yōwa era (1181–1182), during the reign of Emperor Antoku.  The shogunate system was not established in Japan yet.  The famine was most severe in western Honshū (including Kyoto) and Kyushu islands. The famine was caused by an alternating, untimely drought and flood.

During the same period as the famine, there was also the Genpei War (1180-1185), partially caused by famine itself.  In 1181, the Taira clan food requisitions in Yamashiro Province for the needs of starving Kyoto city have cost them popular support, while Minamoto no Yoritomo supplied rice for the starving provinces in exchange for grants for independent rule in Kamakura.

The famine become worse in 1182, as epidemic was superimposed on scarcity of food. The food prices rose to such levels, what man`s load of processed timber was not worth the amount of food to survive a day. The riverbanks were lined with the deceased. According to Kojiki, the number of dead in Kyoto was 43200, and shrines were overwhelmed, resulting in improper burials. Many corpses were left to rot, resulting in foul smells in several districts of the city.

See also
Great Tenmei famine
Kan'ei Great Famine
Kanshō famine
List of famines

References

This page is based on Japanese Wikipedia page 養和の飢饉, accessed 8 July 2019

Famines in Japan
Natural disasters in Japan
1180s in Japan
1181 in Asia
1182 in Asia
12th-century famines